Involuntary means unintended. An involuntary action is one that is unintentional, i.e. without volition or will; see volition (psychology) and will (philosophy). Involuntary may also refer to:

 Involuntary (film), a 2008 Swedish film by Ruben Östlund
"Involuntary", a song on the M. Ward album Transfiguration of Vincent
Involuntary action of the body, also known as reflex
Involuntary commitment, psychiatric examination and/or treatment without patient's consent (including inability to give consent)
 Involuntary Witness, Italian novel
Involuntary park, reclaimed urban region
Involuntary dismissal, court procedure
Involuntary unemployment, unemployment based on wage
Involuntary euthanasia, criminal form of euthanasia

See also 
 Voluntary (disambiguation)
 Involuntary celibate